Johnson County Community College (JCCC) is a public community college in Overland Park, Kansas, which is in Johnson County.

History

In 1963, Johnson County Commissioners, recognizing the emerging community college movement and seeking to accommodate the rapidly growing population of Johnson County, Kansas, formed a committee to examine the feasibility of forming such an institution in Johnson County.

The college was formally established following a successful county-wide election held in March 1967. The existing campus was made possible in 1969 after Johnson County voters approved $12.9 million in bonds to purchase 200 acres of land in Overland Park. Construction began in 1970, and classes and operations were moved to the new campus in the fall of 1972.

Among the college's newest buildings, the Regnier Center and the Nerman Museum of Contemporary Art, opened in 2007. Galileo's Pavilion, an environmentally friendly building, opened in 2012. JCCC broke ground in 2012 for the Hospitality & Culinary Academy, which opened in the fall of 2013.

Academics
JCCC offers a range of undergraduate credit courses that form the first two years of most college curricula. Class size averages 25 to 30 students. The college has more than 100 transfer agreements with regional colleges and universities, which assure admittance without loss of time or credit. More than 41 percent of JCCC students enrolled in fall 2014 planned to transfer to another college or university. More than 50 one- and two-year career degree and certificate programs prepare students to enter the job market in high-employment fields. JCCC has nine selective-admission programs.

The college has 926 full-time faculty and staff. Another 1,451 people work as adjunct faculty or part-time staff. Most faculty members have master's degrees, and many have or are earning doctorates. Faculty and staff have won many awards for excellence.

JCCC has an open-admissions policy. Students wishing to attend the college must file an application, submit official transcripts and complete an assessment process. Students may register for classes via the Internet.

The school offers student clubs, study-abroad programs, a police academy, agriculture school, a theater arts program and much more. Billington Library is the most notable library at the school, with a collection of books and technology for all students and community members to use.

Administration

JCCC is governed by a seven-member board of trustees elected at-large from the community to four-year terms. The board governs the college and sets the budget and local tax levy. Every other year, in odd calendar years, three trustees face re-election.

Athletics

Notable alumni
 Sharice Davids, U.S. House of Representatives from Kansas' 3rd congressional district
 Tony Harris, Former NBA (Basketball) Player, Boston Celtics
 Heather Meyer, Kansas State Representative
 Kit Pellow, former MLB (Baseball) Player, Colorado Rockies
 Kevin Rathbun, Chef
 Ed Wildberger, Missouri State Representative

See also
Thompson v. Johnson County Community College

References

External links

 
Community colleges in Kansas
Two-year colleges in the United States
Educational institutions established in 1969
Education in Johnson County, Kansas
Buildings and structures in Overland Park, Kansas
1969 establishments in Kansas
NJCAA athletics